Molokovka is the name of several rural localities in Russia:
Molokovka, Ivanovo Oblast, a village in Kineshemsky District of Ivanovo Oblast; 
Molokovka, Zabaykalsky Krai, a settlement in Chitinsky District of Zabaykalsky Krai